FC Avanhard Ternopil was a football club based in Ternopil, Ukrainian SSR. The club played in the Soviet Second League 1960–1971. During that time the club also used to be called Budivelnyk. Its games it played at Ternopilsky Misky Stadion that was called Avanhard Stadium.

Currently in Ternopil there is another football club, FC Nyva Ternopil that one might mistakenly confuse with the former Avanhard. That club moved to the town from Berezhany, Ternopil Oblast when Ternopil was left without the big football.

Honors
Championship of the Ukrainian SSR
Winner (1): 1968
Cup of the Ukrainian SSR
Runner up (1): 1958

See also
 FC Nyva Ternopil

External links
 Avanhard Ternopil. lena-dvorkina.narod.ru

 
Avanhard Ternopil
Avanhard Ternopil
Avanhard (sports society)
Avanhard Ternopil
Association football clubs established in 1959
Association football clubs disestablished in the 1970s
1959 establishments in Ukraine
1970s disestablishments in Ukraine